The protozoon Vorticella campanula is found in freshwater ponds, lakes, rivers, and streams with aquatic vegetation. It has a global distribution. Vorticella campanula is solitary and not colonial but usually social, several of them being found together. Vorticella campanula is a sedentary (fixed) form. It is commonly attached by a long highly contractile stalk to some submerged objects like weeds, animals, or stones. Vorticella campanula  is often found in large groups. All the individuals in the group, however, remain free and independent of each other. Most Vorticella are found in abundance in stagnant water rich in decaying organic matter and feed largely on bacteria, but Vorticella campanula live only in uncontaminated water where bacterial growth is poor.

References
Parker, T. J and Haswell, W. A, (1965) A text book of Zoology, MacMilian & Co.Ltd., London & New York.
Taylor, W. T and Weber, R. J. (1961) General Biology Van Nostran, East West Publications, NY.
Barnes, R. D., (1968) Invertebrate Zoology W.B.Saunders Co., Philadelphia London

Oligohymenophorea
Articles containing video clips
Species described in 1831
Taxa named by Christian Gottfried Ehrenberg